The 2007 Bombardier Learjet 550 was a race in the 2007 IRL IndyCar Series, held at Texas Motor Speedway. It was held over 7 -June 9, 2007, as the seventh round of the seventeen-race calendar. It was also the second of the four night races of the season.

Classification

References
IndyCar Series 

Bombardier Learjet 550
Bombardier Learjet 550
Bombardier Learjet 550
Firestone 600